The Women of the World Poetry Slam (WoWPS) is an annual poetry slam put on by Poetry Slam, Inc. The tournament features individual slam poets from around the world that "live their lives as women" competing to be the highest ranked woman poet in the world.

History 
In 2008, the Women of the World Poetry Slam (WoWPS) was introduced, in which only female and female-identified poets are allowed to compete. WoWPS was the brainchild of Kimberly Simms (PSI EC 2005-2007) and Deborah Marsh. The first WoWPS was held in Detroit, Michigan and the first champion was Andrea Gibson.

Each tournament is held in a different city. Candidate cities submit bids and go through a vetting process.

In late 2015, the languaging around inclusion was updated to read: "Competition at WOWps is limited to poets who live their lives as women. Qualified poets include female assigned or identified individuals who are PSi members and are 18+ years of age, including gender non-conforming individuals."

Format 
The Women of the World Poetry Slam tournament has two days of preliminary rounds, in which poets compete in 1, 2, 3, and 4 minute bouts. Poets read a 4-minute (or less) poem in the 1st round. In the 2nd, they read a 1-minute (or less) poem. On the 2nd night of the competition, poets will read against a different slate of poets and most of them will be in a different venue. In the 1st round, they will read a 2 - minute (or less) poem. In the 2nd round, they will read a 3 minute (or less) poem. At the conclusion of each mini-bout, the poet will receive a ranking of 1-6 based on placement within competition groups. All poets within a mini bout (usually consisting of 6 poets) perform first round, then all poets in same group perform second round with calibration between rounds.

After the preliminary bouts are completed, the poets with the highest scores and ranks advance to the finals. The poet next in line for Finals is designated the calibration poet. All poems in the finals are 3 -minute (or less) poems, with a 20 second grace period. A single poem performed during preliminary bouts may be repeated on Finals. Finals for the Women of the World Poetry Slam will include the top 10-14 scoring and ranking poets based on the total number of participating poets.

There will be 2 sacrificial/calibration poets before finals begins, from the next two ranks of poets who didn’t make finals (for instance, if there are 14 finalists, poets ranked 15 and 16 will be invited to be the sacrificial poets at finals). All finalists will read in the 1st round; the 7 poets with the highest scores move on to the second round. These 7 poets read another poem and the top 4 go to the final round. These 4 poets will each read 1 more poem, and the high score of that round is the Women of the World Poetry Slam Champion. If there is a tie between the top 2 poets, they read 1 more poem in a sudden death match, or they agree to share the title. In a sudden death match, judges indicate which poet they prefer by choosing one poet or the other (no scores) and the champion is crowned.

Tournament results by year

See also
Individual World Poetry Slam
List of performance poets
National Poetry Slam
Oral poetry
Performance poetry
Spoken word

References

External links 
 Official Women of the World Poetry Slam Homepage
 Official Poetry Slam Incorporated Homepage

Poetry slams
Women's organizations